The Peterborough Phantoms are a British ice hockey team that play at the Planet Ice Peterborough Arena, in Bretton, Peterborough. The Peterborough Phantoms ice hockey club was founded in 2002. It replaced the former city based team, the Peterborough Pirates, and plays in the same arena. The team currently competes in the semi-professional National Ice Hockey League, the second tier in British ice hockey below the fully professional Elite Ice Hockey League (EIHL). They previously played in the English Premier Ice Hockey League (EPIHL).

The team won the English Premier League and Cup Double in its first season (2002–03) and retained the Cup the following year. After four years, they won the 2007–08 Knock-out Cup followed by the 2008–09 season in which the Phantoms won the English Premier League, English Premier Cup and the play-offs. In the 2018–19 season, the Phantoms won the NIHL 1 Autumn Cup, NIHL 1 South Cup and NIHL South Playoff competitions, and also finished as part of the NIHL 1 National Playoff Final Four.

Club history
Ice hockey in Peterborough started in late 1981 when the first ice rink built in the UK since the 1960s was opened in the city. The Peterborough Pirates was then formed in the summer of 1982. The team joined Division One of the three division National League and two seasons later won promotion to the top level of UK ice hockey. Attendance topped the 1,000 mark on a regular basis and the Pirates reached the 1991 championship play-off final at Wembley, appearing live on mainstream TV. The played in the final again in 1992, but then struggled in the increasingly competitive 1990s as new arena based teams arrived.

In 2002, the Peterborough Pirates folded and replaced with the Peterborough Phantoms in the lower division English Premier Ice Hockey League (EPIHL). The Phantoms went on to secure a league and Cup championship in their debut season and retained the Cup the following season. They won the Knockout Cup in season 2007–08, and then won all three major honours in 2008–09.

The Phantoms joined the National Ice Hockey League (NIHL) after the EPIHL folded in 2017.

In 2019, a new ten-team division was approved to sit above the existing Division 1 (North and South). Alongside the Phantoms, the National League contains Basingstoke Bison, Bracknell Bees, Hull Pirates, Leeds Chiefs, MK Lightning, Raiders IHC, Sheffield Steeldogs, Swindon Wildcats and Telford Tigers.

Club honours
 EPIHL
 Play-Off Championship winners: 2008–09, 2014–15
 English Premier Cup winners: 2002–03, 2003–04, 2008–09
 League winners: 2002–03, 2008–09
 Knockout Cup winners: 2007–08
 NIHL
 Autumn Cup winners: 2018–19
 South Cup winners: 2018–19
 South Playoff winners: 2018–19

Club roster 2022-23
(*) Denotes a Non-British Trained player (Import)

2021/22 outgoing

Season-by-season record

Retired numbers

22/23 head to head
League, Cup & Play Offs - Record (0-0-0)

22/23 statistics
(source:)

Top ten scorers
League, Cup & Play Offs; as of 24 August 2022

Top ten assisters
League, Cup & Play Offs; as of 24 August 2022

Top ten point scorers
League, Cup & Play Offs; as of 24 August 2022

Top ten penalty minute ratios
League, cup & playoffs; as of 24 August 2022

References

 
Sport in Peterborough
Ice hockey teams in England
EPIHL teams
Ice hockey clubs established in 2002
2002 establishments in England